Svetlogorsk Airport  is an airport in Krasnoyarskiy, Russia located 11 km south of . It handles small transport aircraft.  The airport has an extremely spartan layout with one perpendicular taxiway to the parking area.

Airlines and destinations

References
RussianAirFields.com

Airports built in the Soviet Union
Airports in Krasnoyarsk Krai